Žiletky is a Czech drama film directed by Zdenek Tyc. It was released in 1994.

Cast
 Filip Topol as Andrej Chadima
 Markéta Hrubešová as Kristýna
 Iva Janžurová as Chadimova
 Tomáš Hanák as Míra
 Barbora Lukešová as Eva
 Vera Kubánková as Granny
 Jozef Topol as Father
 Petr Lébl as Angel
 Tereza Pergnerová as Nurse
 Václav Legner
 Zdeněk Vencl

External links
 

Czech drama films
1990s Czech-language films
1994 films